Newmansville is an unincorporated community in northeast Greene County, Tennessee. Newmansville is located at the junction of Tennessee State Routes 93 and 351.

Newmansville Volunteer Fire Department
The Newmansville Volunteer Fire Department serves Northeastern Greene County.

References

Unincorporated communities in Greene County, Tennessee
Unincorporated communities in Tennessee